Pancras or Pancratius (Greek: , Pankratios) is an Italian saint associated with Taormina and venerated as a Christian martyr. His surviving hagiography is purely legendary. He is, however, recorded in some early martyrologies.

Evidence
Pancras is commemorated on 8 July and 3 April in the Martyrologium Hieronymianum (5th century). He is also listed for 8 July in the Neapolitan marble calendar (9th century, but dependent on lost early material). In 591, a church at Messina was dedicated to Saints Stephen, Pankratios and Euplus, which probably refers to Pancras of Taormina and Euplius of Catania.

Legend
According to the legendary Life of Saint Pankratios of Taormina, he was born in Antioch in Cilicia (the modern Adana). He travelled to Jerusalem with his parents during the earthly ministry of Jesus; later the entire family was baptized in Antioch. Pancras withdrew to a cave in Pontus where he was discovered by Saint Peter and was sent to Sicily in the year 40 to be the first Bishop of Tauromenium (the modern Taormina). There he met his death by stoning at the hands of pagan opponents of the new religion.

Veneration
He is venerated as a saint in the Roman Catholic Church and in the Eastern Orthodox Church as a Hieromartyr.

In the Catholic Church his cult is concentrated on the island of Sicily, where the veneration of saints from the eastern Mediterranean was particularly encouraged during the period of Byzantine rule. He is the patron saint of Taormina and Canicattì. His feast day was entered into the Roman Martyrology as 3 April; later this was amended to 8 July. More often he is celebrated on 9 July, the traditional day of his martyrdom. The largest portion of his relics are preserved at Rome.

The Eastern Orthodox Church venerates him on 9 July (22 July, N.S.). He is also, together with martyrs Marcellus and Philagrus, commemorated on 9 February. The Greek calendar also commemorates, on 7 June, the holy women Aesia and Susanna, disciples of Pancras and martyred with him. A portion of his relics are kept on Mount Athos.

The Armenian Apostolic Church venerates him on the Thursday following the first Sunday of Advent. He is known in Armenian as Bagarat (Բագարատ). The Armenian synaxarion (Յայսմաւուրք) gives an extensive account of Pancras' acts, including his evangelization of all the cities and villages of Sicily. 

Saint Pancras of Taormina should not be confused with Saint Pancras of Rome, a young man who was martyred by being beheaded around the year 304.

Depiction in art
In iconography, St Pancras is depicted as an old man with yellowing grey hair, vested as a bishop, holding a cross in his right hand, and a Gospel book in his left. The cross commemorates a miracle attributed to St Pancras whereby he saved the city of Taormina from destruction by the pagan commander Aquilinus. The Gospel represents his preaching of the Christian faith.

See also
 History of Taormina
 Pancras of Rome: most of the churches bearing this name are not connected to the Taormina Pancras

References

External links
 Hieromartyr Pancratius the Bishop of Taormina in Sicily Orthodox Icon and Synaxarion
 The Priestly-Martyr Pancratius from The Prologue from Ohrid
 San Pancrazio di Taormina

Sicilian saints
Saints from Roman Anatolia
40 deaths
People from Taormina
1st-century Christian saints
Year of birth unknown
Religious leaders from the Province of Messina
1st-century Italian bishops